Pradip Somasundaran (born 26 January 1967),  is an Indian playback singer, who sang around 100 songs in Malayalam, Tamil and Hindi languages. He is also a college principal by profession.

Early life
Pradip Somasundaran was born on 26 January 1967 in Nelluvaya, Thrissur district of Kerala. His parents are Somasundaran and Santha. He was initially trained in carnatic music under Geetha Rani and later under V. Gopalan of Thrissur, and started giving stage performances at the age of sixteen.

Music career
It was music director Raveendran who gave Pradip the first break in 1993, with the song "Samayam Manoharam" in the film Ezhuthachan. He has also worked with the late Johnson, Mohan Sithara and Ilaiyaraaja in Malayalam. Sandeep Chowta introduced him in Telugu films with Bujjigadu directed by Puri Jagannadh. He also sang for Saleem another Sandeep Chowta musical, directed by YVS Chowdary. He has also sung the title song "Bhagavane" for the television series Gajarajan Guruvayur Keshavan which was composed by Vidyadharan for Surya TV. In addition to being a playback singer he sings carnatic music, ghazals and devotional songs.

In 2007 he released "Koti Pranam" his first international album as a composer and singer for the Art of Living foundation. In 2011 he released "Mazhanritham" his first musical work in Malayalam as a composer collaborating with other playback singers like Gayatri Asokan, Franco, Shahabaz Aman and actor Manoj K Jayan.

Achievements
He won the "Lata Mangeshkar Trophy" for the best male singer along with Sunidhi Chauhan who won in the female category, in the national level music competition Meri Awaz Suno in 1996, which was telecast by Doordarshan. Meri Awaz Suno was conducted jointly by Doordarshan, Lata Mangeshkar, and Yash Chopra's Metavision.

Personal life
Pradip holds a master's in electronics from Andhra University and is currently working as the principal of College of Applied Science, Vadakkancherry. He is a free software enthusiast and was involved in the activities of the Free Software Foundation India during Richard Stallman's 2001 visit to Kochi. He has been residing at Thrissur for a long time.

Discography

Film songs

Non-film albums

References

External links

 Official website and Music blog
 Official Facebook Page 
 Youtube Link
 

1967 births
Indian male playback singers
Tamil playback singers
Living people
Malayalam playback singers
People from Thrissur district
Telugu playback singers
Singers from Thrissur
Film musicians from Kerala
20th-century Indian singers
21st-century Indian singers
20th-century Indian male singers
21st-century Indian male singers